Clinton Young was an American college football coach. He served as the head football coach at the First District Agricultural School—now known as Arkansas State University—in 1913, compiling a record of 3–1–1.

Head coaching record

References

Year of birth missing
Year of death missing
Arkansas State Red Wolves football coaches